The lowland burrowing tree frog or northern casquehead frog (Smilisca fodiens) is a species of frog in the family Hylidae. It is found in south-central Arizona, the United States, and southward along the coastal plain and foothills to Western and South-Central Mexico. It is a burrowing frog that is common in rain-filled temporary pools, its breeding habitat. It is threatened by habitat loss caused by agricultural development. However, many well-preserved populations have been recorded.

References

Smilisca
Frogs of North America
Amphibians of Mexico
Amphibians of the United States
Amphibians described in 1882
Taxa named by George Albert Boulenger
Taxonomy articles created by Polbot